Romance of the West is a 1946 American Western film directed by Robert Emmett Tansey and written by Frances Kavanaugh. The film stars Eddie Dean, Emmett Lynn, Joan Barton, Forrest Taylor, Robert McKenzie, Jerry Jerome, Stanley Price and Chief Thundercloud. The film was released on March 20, 1946, by Producers Releasing Corporation.

Plot

Cast          
Eddie Dean as Eddie Dean
Emmett Lynn as Ezra
Joan Barton as Melodie
Forrest Taylor as Father Sullivan
Robert McKenzie as Lem Matthews
Jerry Jerome as Duke Morris
Stanley Price as Jim Lockwood
Chief Thundercloud as Chief Eagle Feather
Don Reynolds as Little Brown Jug
Lottie Harrison as Miss Twitchell

References

External links
 

1946 films
1940s English-language films
American Western (genre) films
1946 Western (genre) films
Producers Releasing Corporation films
Films directed by Robert Emmett Tansey
1940s American films